Kaboklei (English: Cape jasmine flower) is a 2009 Indian Meitei language film directed by Pilu Heigrujam and produced by Bandana Maisnam. It stars Manda Leima as the titular protagonist with Hamom Sadananda and Huirem Seema in the lead roles. The screenplay by Narendra Ningomba is based on Khaidem Pramodini's play Kabok Oikhrabi Kaboklei. The film was released at Hapta Kangjeibung, Imphal on 9 January 2009.

Synopsis
Kaboklei is a straightforward, free-spirited lady who never fears anyone and always stands for truth. Her mother goes to the market daily in order to keep the kitchen fire burning while her father is bedridden due to prolonged illness. Unforeseen circumstances play out one after another in front of Kaboklei and none of them is in favour of her well-being. She continues to fight bravely despite the never-ending tussle between her life and fate. Unfortunately, fate wins in the end.

Cast
 Manda Leima as Kaboklei
 Hamom Sadananda as Pamheiba
 Huirem Seema as Kaboklei's mother
 Ranjit as Kaboklei's father
 Sagolsem Dhanamanjuri as Indu
 Sorri Senjam as Khagemba, Pamheiba's younger brother
 Wangkhem Lalitkumar as Minister, Pamheiba's father
 R.K. Hemabati as Minister's wife
 Narendra Ningomba as Manihar
 Heisnam Geeta as Manihar's wife
 Bhogen as Kaboklei's local brother
 Rina as Thagoi, Nurse
 Ratan

Reception
Pradip Phanjoubam wrote about the film in Imphal Review of Arts and Politics, "Kaboklei belonged to a different story telling style altogether, and just as nothing is in black and white in life, nothing or little are in black and white this story either. Even the ways of providence are not predictable, and portrayed as neutral determinant of life as it unfolds differently for different people. This willingness to see reality as it is and not as a sugar-coated melodrama is not a wonder, considering the film is based on a short story by the late Khaidem Pramodini, sensitive and prolific poet, a contemporary of the late MK Binodini."

Accolades
The movie won three awards at the 7th Manipur State Film Festival 2010.

Soundtrack
Ranbir Thouna composed the soundtrack for the film and Dr. S. Ibomcha and Khaidem Imo wrote the lyrics. The songs are titled Mamingtagi Hingliba Punsi and Lansonbigi Lamyaida.

References

Meitei-language films
2009 films